Marie-Anne France Jacqueline Chazel (born 19 September 1951) is a French actress, screenwriter and director, who has been active in both film and television since 1974.

Biography 

Chazel was born to actress Louba Guertchikoff (birth name Louba Louise Pinon; 1919–1999) in Gap, Hautes-Alpes.
 
From 1967, Chazel studied at Pasteur College, alongside Michel Blanc, Gerard Jugnot, Thierry Lhermitte and Christian Clavier. After the achievement of her baccalaureate and two years of studies of political sciences, she and her college comrades formed a theatrical troop in 1974 named Le Splendid, joined by Josiane Balasko.

Chazel achieved popularity as Gigi in Les Bronzés (1978) directed by Patrice Leconte. She is best known for her role as Ginette in Les Visiteurs (1993).

From 1976 to 2001, Chazel was married to actor Christian Clavier. They have one child, a daughter Margot Clavier (b. 1983).

Filmography

Theater

References

External links 
 
 Marie-Anne Chazel at AlloCiné 
 Marie-Anne Chazel at TeeMix.com 

1951 births
Living people
People from Gap, Hautes-Alpes
French film actresses
French women screenwriters
French screenwriters
French television actresses
20th-century French actresses
21st-century French actresses